The 1982–83 Rugby League Premiership was the ninth end of season Rugby League Premiership competition.

The winners were Widnes.

First round

Semi-finals

Final

References

1983 in English rugby league